Birch Bay State Park is a  Washington state park located  south of Blaine in Whatcom County. Recreational opportunities include camping, picnicking, fishing, hiking, crabbing, clamming, and boating.

References

External links
Birch Bay State Park Washington State Parks and Recreation Commission 
Birch Bay State Park Map Washington State Parks and Recreation Commission

State parks of Washington (state)
Parks in Whatcom County, Washington